AH-64D Longbow is a realistic combat flight simulator of the AH-64D Apache Longbow attack helicopter. Released on May 31, 1996, for the PC, this simulation was developed at Origin Systems. AH-64D Longbow was the second simulator released under the Jane's Combat Simulators line from Electronic Arts.

A mission disk Flash Point: Korea was released as an add-in in 1996, and a compilation pack, Longbow Gold was released in 1997. A sequel, Longbow 2 was released in late 1997. In 1998, Longbow Anthology was released, which included the whole Longbow series.

Gameplay

The game had the most authentic flight model for a helicopter for its time and every aspect of the electronics systems were meticulously detailed. The weapons had realistic operational ranges and limits, and all friendly and enemy units were strictly based on their real-life counterparts. A wingman helps the player, and the player takes on Russian equipment in multiple single missions and campaigns, as well as a handful of historically accurate missions in which it is possible to 're-live' memorable battles.

Flash Point: Korea was released on November 30, 1996. It features a new campaign set in Korea, the addition of the co-pilot position, improved wingman commands and many bug fixes.

Release

Longbow Gold came out in April 1997. It is a compilation pack featuring the AH-64D Longbow and Flash Point: Korea add-ons. It is also fully patched and updated to include a Windows executable, so DOS is no longer necessary. Also included is the 3Dfx update, which adds a Glide renderer.

Longbow Anthology was released in 1998 and is a compilation of Jane's AH-64D Longbow, the mission disk Flash Point: Korea, and Longbow 2 in one box, with an abbreviated manual. All included simulators are fully patched to the latest versions.

A Limited Edition was also released, removing the campaign mode and marketed as a budget title.

Reception

AH-64D Longbow debuted at No. 4 on PC Data's monthly computer game sales chart for June 1996. The game fell to position 14 the following month, before rising back into the top 10 in August and exiting the top 20 in September. In the United States, the game sold 106,423 copies and earned $4.78 million by October 1999. Global shipments of AH-64D Longbow ultimately surpassed 600,000 copies. The Longbow franchise as a whole, including the compilations and Jane's Longbow 2, shipped above 1.2 million units.

The reviewer for Next Generation praised the option to choose from nine different levels of realism, and the game's unique mission design.

Longbow was named the best flight simulator of 1996 by PC Gamer, GameSpot, Computer Gaming World and Computer Games Strategy Plus. CNET Gamecenter and the Computer Game Developers Conference nominated it in their "Best Simulation Game" categories, but these went to NASCAR Racing 2 and MechWarrior 2: Mercenaries, respectively. In 1996, Computer Gaming World ranked it as the 100th best game of all time for being "the first helicopter sim to match its fixed wing counterparts for realistic play". That same year, it was also ranked as the 73rd top game of all time by Next Generation, for being "an unbeatable marriage of graphics, gameplay, and armor-blasting fun".

Flashpoint Korea
The editors of PC Gamer US named Flashpoint Korea 1996's "Best Expansion Pack", and wrote that it "practically makes [Longbow] a whole new game". Flashpoint: Korea was also a finalist for Computer Gaming Worlds 1996 "Best Enhancement of an Existing Game" award, which ultimately went to Warcraft II: Beyond the Dark Portal.

See also 

Apache and Hind, competitor games by Digital Integration

References

External links 

SimHQ Forums for Jane's Longbow series
SimHQ.com - Air Combat Zone - Janes Combat Simulations Longbow Series

Review in PC World

1996 video games
Cold War video games
AH-64D Longbow
Combat flight simulators
DOS games
Electronic Arts games
Helicopter video games
Video games scored by Barry Leitch
Video games with expansion packs
Video games with historical settings
Windows games
Video games developed in the United States